Saddar Harnai is town and union council of Sibi District in the Balochistan province of Pakistan.

References

Populated places in Sibi District
Union councils of Balochistan, Pakistan